Cofiroute USA is a wholly owned subsidiary of Cofiroute, S.A (France) and is part of the VINCI Group, the world’s leading concession and construction group.

Company history

In 1989, the California Legislature Assembly Bill 680, permitting a limited number of toll facilities to be developed using public-private partnerships. The California Private Transportation Company (CPTC) - consisting of Kiewit, Granite Construction and Cofiroute - was formed to finance, develop and operate the 91 Express Lanes. CPTC entered into a 35-year franchise agreement with the California Department of Transportation (Caltrans) for that purpose. The 91 Express Lanes, the first all electronic toll facility in the world, proved to be extremely successful. However, for various business reasons CPTC decided to sell its franchise rights to the 91 Express Lanes to OCTA in 2002. Cofiroute remained as the 91 Express Lanes’ operator under contract with OCTA.

The decision was then made to expand Cofiroute's North American business and, in January 2003, Cofiroute USA was formed as a wholly owned subsidiary of Cofiroute, S.A. Later that year, Cofiroute USA joined a consortium consisting of Wilbur Smith Associates, Raytheon, SRF Consulting and Frank Wilson & Associates to bid on the Interstate 394 HOV Lane conversion in Minneapolis. The team was awarded the contract in December 2003 and the first conversion of a High Occupancy Vehicle (HOV) Lane to a High Occupancy Toll (HOT) facility was completed and opened in May 2005.

Network
Cofiroute USA develops and operates toll collection systems, roadway operations, customer relationship management and integrated technology solutions for toll facilities in the United States. Cofiroute USA serves as the operator of the 91 Express Lanes and is also a member of the consortium that was awarded the MnPass Program contract.

Tolls
Texas Toll 183A
Texas Toll 71
Texas Toll 290
Texas Toll 45
Texas Toll 1

External links
Cofiroute, S.A (France) Wikipedia Article
91 Express Lanes
MnPass
International Bridge, Tunnel and Turnpike Association IBTTA
Cofiroute USA Official website

References

Transportation in California